Quddus Muhammadiy (1907–1997) was an Uzbek writer of children's literature, a poet, academic writer, and playwright. He was born to a family of farmers in Tashkent on 25 October 1907. After secondary-agricultural school, he studied at the faculty of biology at the University of Central Asia.

His first works were published in the newspaper East and in the Journal of the Face of the Earth. From 1928, his poems were published in the press under the pseudonym 'Jerusalem'. His famous poems such as "Sandals and stove" and "Self-criticism" were created in the years 1936–1937. Both old traditions and modern idioms were reflected in his poems, together with irony, satire, and humor. Muhammadiy's works are considered educational and uplifting. His children's books embody vibrant and dynamic images and art combined. He always believed that the life of people, including children's character, is formed from the effects of discrimination. He was also known as a skilled interpreter. His translations of S. Marshak, S. Mixalkov, A. Barton, and K. Chukovskiy’s works played an important role in the development of Uzbek children's literature. He was awarded the Hamza State Prize in (1969) and the title of People's Poet of Uzbekistan in 1977. A  poet for children, Muhammadiy died in the city of Tashkent on 22 June 1997.

Selected works
 Surprise the Reader (1946)
 Test (1947)
 The Reader Memorable (1947)
 Poetry and Fairy Tales (1947)
 Dream (1948)
 Spring (1950)
 The Most Powerful in the World? (1951)
 Forty Girls (1951)
 Our friends (1952)
 Your Birthday (1952)
 The New House (1953)
 Good Friends (1953)
 The Beetle and the Little Mouse (1955)
 Button (1956)
 What Ought I to Do? (1960)
 Very Interesting, Very Beautiful (1961)
 Mother-Child Love (1963)
 The Beginning of the Child
 The Age of Boys (1964)
 Inspiration (1967)
 Little Friends (1978)
 The Song of the Shepherd (1979)
 The Book and the Sun (1986)
 I Want You to Speak Wisdom (1987)

See also
 Abdulla Qahhor
 Abdulla Oripov
 Cho'lpon
 G'afur G'ulom
 Khudoyberdi Tuktaboyev
 Tohir Malik

References

External links

 Quddus Muhammadiy biography in Russian

1907 births
1997 deaths
20th-century Uzbekistani poets
Writers from Tashkent
People from Syr-Darya Oblast
Soviet male poets
Uzbekistani male poets
Soviet dramatists and playwrights
Uzbekistani dramatists and playwrights
20th-century male writers
Recipients of the Order of Friendship of Peoples